was a town located in Akaiwa District, Okayama Prefecture, Japan.

As of 2003, the town had an estimated population of 24,939 and a density of 719.95 persons per km2. The total area was 34.64 km2.

On March 7, 2005, San'yō, along with the towns of Akasaka, Kumayama and Yoshii (all from Akaiwa District), were merged to create the city of Akaiwa.

Dissolved municipalities of Okayama Prefecture
Akaiwa, Okayama